The Port of Hobart (known also as Hobart Marine Board) is situated on the Derwent River, as the port of Hobart, Tasmania, Australia.

History
The historic part of the port was founded and developed in Sullivans Cove.

Docks 
Constitution Dock and Victoria Dock.

Tug Boats
List of Hobart Tug Boats

Administration
It is one of 12 ports administered by the state government authority Tasports, otherwise known as the Tasmanian Ports Corporation

The port authority was created by the amalgamation of the state's four port companies – Hobart Ports Corporation Pty Ltd, Port of Launceston Pty Ltd, Port of Devonport Corporation Pty Ltd and Burnie Port Corporation Pty Ltd – on 1 January 2006.

The earlier name of the authority was the Marine Board of Hobart

See also

List of ports in Australia

References

 
Hobart
Hobart
River Derwent (Tasmania)